Adam and Eve or Adam and Eve Sleeping is a 1905 marble sculpture by Auguste Rodin. It is located in the Musee Rodin in France.

See also
List of sculptures by Auguste Rodin
Young Woman with a Serpent, 1885 Rodin sculpture

Notes

References

External links

Sculptures by Auguste Rodin
Marble sculptures
Cultural depictions of Adam and Eve
1905 sculptures